The 1.2-centimeter or 24 GHz band is a portion of the SHF (microwave) radio spectrum internationally allocated to amateur radio and amateur satellite use.  The amateur radio band is between 24.00 GHz and 24.25 GHz, and the amateur satellite band is between 24.00 GHz and 24.05 GHz.  Amateurs operate on a primary basis between 24.00 GHz and 24.05 GHz and on a secondary basis in the rest of the band.  Amateur stations must accept harmful interference from ISM users.  The allocations are the same in all three ITU regions.

List of notable frequencies 
24.0482 GHz Narrow band calling frequency
24.0488 to 24.048995 GHz Radio propagation beacons
24.1921 GHz USA narrow band calling frequency

Wideband FM Channels 
Common Wideband FM frequencies used with gunnplexers.  Operation is in full-duplex with a 30 MHz split:
24.125 GHz †
24.155 GHz

† Also the center frequency for ISM devices operating in the band.

See also 
Amateur radio frequency allocations

References 

Amateur radio bands
Centimetric bands